Runingo is a town in South Kivu in eastern Democratic Republic of the Congo. It is located near the border with Burundi along National Highway 5, north of Butaho.

Populated places in South Kivu